Eduard Léon Juliaan van Vliet (11 September 1942 in Antwerp – 5 October 2002 in Roeselare) was a Belgian writer and lawyer. He graduated in law at the Vrije Universiteit Brussel. The fact that his father left his family, played an important role in his poetry.

Bibliography
 Het lied van ik (1964) 
 Duel (1967) 
 Columbus tevergeefs (1969) 
 Van bittere tranen, kollebloemen e.a. blozende droefheden (1971) 
 De vierschaar (1973) 
 Het grote verdriet (1974) 
 Na de wetten van Afscheid & Herfst (1978) 
 Poëzie is een daad van bevestiging (1978) 
 Glazen (1979) 
 Is dit genoeg: een stuk of wat gedichten (1982) 
 Jaren na maart (1983) 
 De binnenplaats (1987) 
 De toekomstige dief (1991) 
 Poëzie (1991) 
 Een lekker hapje voor Winston (1996) 
 Zoals in een fresco de kleur (1996) 
 Vader (2001)

Awards
 1971 - Arkprijs van het Vrije Woord
 1975 - Jan Campertprijs

See also
 Flemish literature

Sources
 Eddy Van Vliet (in Dutch)
 Bartosik, Michel, Eddy van Vliet. In: Kritisch lexikon van de Nederlandstalige literatuur na 1945 (1989).
 Willem M. Roggeman, Eddy van Vliet In: Beroepsgeheim 4 (1983)

1942 births
2002 deaths
Flemish writers
Vrije Universiteit Brussel alumni
Ark Prize of the Free Word winners